Johanna Andersson (born 7 October 1989) is a Swedish footballer who played for Vittsjö GIK.

External links 
 

1989 births
Living people
Swedish women's footballers
Vittsjö GIK players
Damallsvenskan players
Women's association football midfielders